Marinus Andersen (19 April 1895, Aalborg - 14 March 1985) was a Danish architect.

See also
List of Danish architects

References

1895 births
1985 deaths
Danish architects
People from Aalborg